Alfred Holt (2 March 1863 – 3 February 1942) was an English first-class cricketer.

Holt was born at the City of London. He made his debut in first-class cricket for the Gentlemen of England against Oxford University at Oxford in 1881. He made a second appearance in first-class cricket in 1883 for the Marylebone Cricket Club against Kent at Lord's. He scored 39 runs across his two matches, with a high score of 31. He died at Battersea in February 1942.

References

External links

1863 births
1942 deaths
People from the City of London
English cricketers
Gentlemen of England cricketers
Marylebone Cricket Club cricketers